Nerabus (otherwise Nereabolls) is a hamlet in the west of the isle of Islay in Scotland. The vicinity is noted for its scenic qualities and diverse birdlife. Nerabus lies along the A847 road on the route from Port Charlotte to Portnahaven. The locale has an early influence by the Norse.

References
Notes

Sources
 Parliament of Great Britain. House of Commons. 1895. Parliamentary papers, page 804

External links

Canmore - Islay, Nereabolls, Chapel site record
Canmore - Islay, Nereabolls, Nereabolls Cross Head and Cross Shaft site record
 From Port Charlotte to Portnahaven

Villages in Islay